Charles Joseph Carney (April 17, 1913 – October 7, 1987) was a U.S. Representative from Ohio from 1970 to 1979.

Early life and career 
Born in Youngstown, Ohio, Carney attended schools in Youngstown and neighboring Campbell, Ohio.  He later attended Youngstown State University. Carney was a member of the Ohio Senate from 1950 to 1970, serving as minority leader from 1969 to 1970.

Prior to his involvement in public service, Carney was involved with Youngstown-area labor organizations.  He served as a staff member of the vice-president, and president, of the United Rubber Workers Union Local 102 from 1934 to 1950.  He served as staff representative of United Steelworkers of America from 1950 to 1968. Carney also served as vice-president of the Mahoning County CIO Industrial Council.

Congress
Carney was elected as a Democrat in 1970, defeating attorney Richard McLaughlin, to the Ninety-first Congress, by special election, to fill the vacancy caused by the death of United States Representative Michael J. Kirwan, and reelected to the four succeeding Congresses, from (November 3, 1970 – January 3, 1979).  He was an unsuccessful candidate for reelection to the Ninety-sixth Congress in 1978.

Death
Charles Joseph Carney died on October 7, 1987, in Youngstown, Ohio.  He was interred in Calvary Cemetery.

References

1913 births
1987 deaths
American trade union leaders
Politicians from Youngstown, Ohio
Youngstown State University alumni
Cleveland–Marshall College of Law alumni
Democratic Party Ohio state senators
Democratic Party members of the United States House of Representatives from Ohio
20th-century American politicians
Activists from Ohio